Hope Valley is a village and census-designated place (CDP) in the town of Hopkinton in Washington County, Rhode Island, United States.  The population of the CDP was 1,612 at the 2010 census. Hope Valley is the largest village in Hopkinton and the town's principal commercial center. While the village of Hope Valley is located in Hopkinton, its zip code, 02832, extends into the neighboring town of Richmond.

The central portion of the village was listed on the National Register of Historic Places in 2004 as the Hope Valley Historic District. The  historic district includes 134 contributing buildings and three other contributing structures.

History
The earliest European-American settlement of the village site was by Hezekiah Carpenter, who arrived in 1770 and dammed the Wood River and built several small water-powered mills. His settlement was called Carpenter's Mills. Around 1818 a tannery was built at the site. The textile industry arrived in 1824, when Gardner Nichols and Russell Thayer bought the existing mills and began to operate them for carding of wool; fulling, coloring and finishing of cloth; and manufacture of textile machinery.

The formerly separate village of Locustville, which grew up along Brushy Brook, is now part of Hope Valley. A dam and mill were built at the site of Locustville in 1820. In the late 19th century the Locustville mill property was taken over by the Nichols and Langworthy Company, which had operated the Hope Valley mills since 1835.

There are conflicting versions of the origin of the village's name. The word "Hope" is the Rhode Island motto and used in various place names in Rhode Island. The phrase is used on the Rhode Island State Seal with an anchor because Roger Williams was inspired by the Biblical passage "hope is the anchor of the soul" in Hebrews, Verse 6:19. In 2008 a town historian told the Providence Journal that Gardner Nichols renamed the village from Carpenter's Mills to Hope Valley “because all of his hopes were centered” in the village. This version also appears in History of the State of Rhode Island.

Geography
Hope Valley is located at  (41.511877, -71.715411).

According to the United States Census Bureau, the CDP has a total area of 9.1 km2 (3.5 mi2). 8.5 km2 (3.3 mi2) of it is land and 0.5 km2 (0.2 mi2) of it (5.43%) is water.

Demographics

As of the census of 2000, there were 1,649 people, 630 households, and 464 families residing in the CDP. The population density was 192.9/km2 (499.0/mi2). There were 663 housing units at an average density of 77.6/km2 (200.6/mi2). The racial makeup of the CDP was 97.03% White, 0.73% African American, 0.97% Native American, 0.18% Asian, 0.12% from other races, and 0.97% from two or more races.  Hispanic or Latino of any race were 0.67% of the population.

There were 630 households, out of which 39.2% had children under the age of 18 living with them, 59.5% were married couples living together, 10.0% had a female householder with no husband present, and 26.3% were non-families. 22.2% of all households were made up of individuals, and 7.8% had someone living alone who was 65 years of age or older. The average household size was 2.62 and the average family size was 3.06.

In the CDP, the population was spread out, with 26.7% under the age of 18, 7.5% from 18 to 24, 31.6% from 25 to 44, 24.4% from 45 to 64, and 9.8% who were 65 years of age or older. The median age was 37 years. For every 100 females, there were 101.3 males. For every 100 females age 18 and over, there were 97.4 males.

The median income for a household in the CDP was $43,264, and the median income for a family was $47,857. Males had a median income of $33,462 versus $28,125 for females. The per capita income for the CDP was $18,925. About 2.9% of families and 3.8% of the population were below the poverty line, including 4.7% of those under the age of 18 and 5.7% of those 65 and older.

Notable people
Prudence Crandall, who established a pioneering school for African-American girls, was born in 1803 in the area that is now Hope Valley. A granite marker erected in her memory stands in the village. 

Hope Valley is also the hometown of country music singer Billy Gilman.

Notable Places include the Wood River Inn as well, as well as the historic town hall

See also
National Register of Historic Places listings in Washington County, Rhode Island

References

Census-designated places in Washington County, Rhode Island
Villages in Washington County, Rhode Island
Hopkinton, Rhode Island
Historic districts in Washington County, Rhode Island
Providence metropolitan area
Villages in Rhode Island
Census-designated places in Rhode Island
Historic districts on the National Register of Historic Places in Rhode Island
1770 establishments in Rhode Island
Populated places established in 1770
National Register of Historic Places in Washington County, Rhode Island